Vyatskopolyansky District, sometimes spelled Vyatsko-Polyansky District, is an administrative and municipal district (raion), one of the thirty-nine in Kirov Oblast, Russia. It is located in the southeast of the oblast. Its administrative center is the town of Vyatskiye Polyany (which is not administratively a part of the district). Population:  34,044 (2002 Census);

Administrative and municipal status
Within the framework of administrative divisions, Vyatskopolyansky District is one of the thirty-nine in the oblast. The town of Vyatskiye Polyany serves as its administrative center, despite being incorporated separately as an administrative unit with the status equal to that of the districts.

As a municipal division, the district is incorporated as Vyatskopolyansky Municipal District. The Town of Vyatskiye Polyany is incorporated separately from the district as Vyatskiye Polyany Urban Okrug.

References

Notes

Sources

Districts of Kirov Oblast
